Robert Harmen "Rob" Anderson (born June 13, 1977) is a Canadian politician and a former Member of the Legislative Assembly of Alberta; he represented the constituency of Airdrie. He was a Progressive Conservative until he crossed the floor on January 4, 2010 to join the Wildrose Party. He was reelected in the 2012 Alberta general election, with 16 other Wildrose MLAs to form the Official Opposition.

On December 17, 2014, Anderson resigned from the Wildrose caucus to cross the floor and rejoin the governing Progressive Conservative Association of Alberta caucus, along with eight other Wildrose MLAs.

Political career
Anderson was elected to his first term in Alberta's Legislative Assembly as the Member for Airdrie-Chestermere in the 2008 provincial election.

During his first term, Anderson was appointed as a member of the Provincial Treasury Board and served on the standing and cabinet policy committees on Public Safety and Services as well as the Private Bills committee. He also served as the parliamentary assistant to the Solicitor General and Minister of Public Security.

Anderson's duties as parliamentary assistant included overseeing stakeholder consultations toward developing Alberta's new law enforcement framework; conducting industry consultations for and sponsoring the Security Services and Investigators Act (2008); and sponsoring the Alberta Gaming & Liquor Amendment Act (2009).

Anderson was also the writer and sponsor of a private members bill, the Election Finances and Contributions Disclosure (Third Party Advertising) Amendment Act (2009).

Anderson left the Progressive Conservative Party in January 2010 to join the Wildrose Alliance Party, which later changed its name to the Wildrose Party.  When future Wildrose leader Danielle Smith made it known she was leaving the Tories for the Wildrose a year earlier, the Tory leadership was concerned enough to ask Anderson to try to talk her into staying.  Anderson told Smith that despite the Tories' reckless spending and unwillingness to listen to the backbenchers, there was no viable alternative on the right. Smith was unmoved, saying that the Wildrose was the only realistic chance to elect a truly fiscally conservative government in Alberta. As far as Smith was concerned, the Tories were "beyond redemption" and "out of control."  When Anderson finally joined, Smith named him deputy leader.

On April 23, 2012, Anderson was re-elected with 57% of the votes in Airdrie, essentially a redrawn version of his old riding. The Wildrose won 17 seats in that election, making Anderson Deputy Leader of the Opposition. Shortly after the election he was appointed house leader and finance critic for the Official Opposition and was named chair of the Standing Committee on Public Accounts which is all-party committee consisting of 18 Members of the Legislative Assembly that reviews the annual report of the Auditor General of Alberta and the public accounts of the province. He also served on the standing committees for Resource Stewardship as well as the Alberta Heritage Savings Trust Fund.

Anderson's first motion after being re-elected was Motion 506 which urged the government to bring forward legislation that would limit spending increases to no more than population growth plus inflation; prohibit the introduction of a budget that proposes a cash deficit; allocate half of all cash surpluses to the Alberta Heritage Savings Trust Fund; and, amend the appropriate legislation to suspend the practice of spending the interest generated by the Fund until it reaches an amount of at least $200 billion.

In response to the provincial government's 2013-2014 budget, Anderson and the Official Opposition released the Wildrose Financial Recovery Plan, which would have eliminated the operating deficit this year and restored a modest surplus by 2014. In February 2013, Anderson, Drew Barnes and Danielle Smith released the Wildrose 10-year Debt Free Capital Plan. The plan called for $4 billion in capital infrastructure projects in 2013 and $48 billion over 10 years.

Anderson launched an online political commentary show called "Rob Anderson Unfiltered", on which he is an advocate for Alberta asserting its provincial rights within a united Canada if at all possible.

In September 2021 Rob worked with Barry Cooper and Derek From to produce the Free Alberta Strategy, a series of initiatives to make Alberta a sovereign jurisdiction. Anderson said the Free Alberta Strategy also calls for the end of any transferring of taxes from Alberta to Ottawa.

Anderson supported Danielle Smith as Campaign Chair in her 2022 run for UCP leadership before moving to Transition Team Chair Executive Director of the Premier’s Office following her becoming premier.

Early life
Anderson was born in Edmonton, the oldest of seven children. The family lived in Sherwood Park for most of Anderson's early years before moving in 1990 to Airdrie.

Anderson spent much of his time playing sports—particularly hockey and football. He won the Edmonton City Championship as defensive captain for the Salisbury High School football team in Sherwood Park, and was named the starting goaltender for the Brigham Young University Cougar's hockey team.

Taiwan missionary service
When he was nineteen years old, Anderson spent two years living in Taiwan doing missionary service for the Church of Jesus Christ of Latter-day Saints, where he learnt to speak Mandarin Chinese fluently, and worked as a caregiver for high-needs individuals and taught English as a second language.

Education and awards
In 2003, Anderson graduated magna cum laude from Brigham Young University with a Bachelor of Arts in communications.

Three years later, Anderson obtained a Bachelor of Laws degree from the University of Alberta, graduating ‘with distinction’ honours.

While at law school, Anderson earned the Merv Leitch QC Scholarship for superior academic standing in Constitutional Law and participation in related extra-curricular activities.

Anderson co-founded the organization Students for a Stronger Alberta. This group advocated for democratic reform and more meaningful voter participation in the democratic process, printed a university newspaper (‘the Independent’) focused on debating relevant public policy and political issues of the day, and organized a speaker series on strengthening democracy that included Preston Manning, Ted Morton and David Kilgour.

Business experience
Prior to his election as a Member of the Legislative Assembly, Anderson practiced corporate litigation law at Borden Ladner Gervais LLP in Calgary.

Rob Anderson is currently a partner at Warnock Kraft Anderson in Airdrie, Alberta, and head of the corporate litigation practice.

During his time at law school, Anderson founded an online family entertainment business, selling it shortly before entering politics.

Election results

References

External links
Rob Anderson's web page

1977 births
20th-century Mormon missionaries
Brigham Young University alumni
Canadian expatriates in Taiwan
Canadian Latter Day Saints
Canadian Mormon missionaries
Lawyers in Alberta
Living people
Mormon missionaries in Taiwan
People from Airdrie, Alberta
Politicians from Edmonton
Progressive Conservative Association of Alberta MLAs
University of Alberta alumni
Wildrose Party MLAs
Canadian expatriates in the United States
21st-century Canadian politicians